Kléber João Boas Pereira (or simply Kléber Boas or Kléber Pereira or Kléber Banguela in Brazil; born 13 August 1975 in Peri Mirim-MA, Brazil) is a retired Brazilian footballer who last played for Moto Club. A tall and gangly player with a good heading ability, Kléber played as a striker.

Career

Brazil 
Described as a late bloomer by scouts, Kléber began his career in the Brazilian professional league Second Division, playing for Moto Club in 1996. Except for a six-month stint at Náutico, Kléber remained at Moto Club until 1999. In the middle of the 1999 season, Kléber was transferred to Atlético Paranaense, where he enjoyed success, winning the goalscoring title in 2001. After his breakout season, he was courted by other teams in Brazil, as well as scouts from foreign clubs.

Mexico 
Prior to the Clausura 2003 season, Kléber was announced as the star signing by the UANL Tigres in Monterrey, Mexico. In his first season, he scored ten goals and helped the team reach the semifinals in the playoffs. The following season, scored eight goals while helping the team to a berth in the Apertura 2003 finals, where they lost to Pachuca.

After his immediate success at Tigres, Kléber' performance dropped off and he was mostly relegated to the bench for the Clausura 2004 season, scoring only one goal. Following the Clausura 2004 season, he was transferred to Veracruz, where he enjoyed limited success, scoring twice. Thanks to a recommendation by his ex-teammate Cuauhtémoc Blanco, Kléber was signed by Club América following his lone season at Veracruz. There, he regained his goalscoring prowess, scoring 14 goals in his first season at the club, helping them to a championship in the Clausura 2005 season. Kléber did not actually play in the final, after being suspended for three games due to kicking Federico Lussenhoff of Cruz Azul in the groin in one of the semifinal matches. The following season, Kléber won his second goalscoring title, sharing it with three other players (Vicente Matías Vuoso, Walter Gaitán and Sebastián Abreu).

Prior to the Apertura 2006 season, he was loaned out to sister club Necaxa (Despite playing in the same league, Club América, Necaxa and Club San Luis are owned by the same conglomerate).

Kléber is a member of the "Blanco Four", a group of players who once played at Veracruz with Blanco and were signed by América after being recommended by the striker. The other members are Christian Giménez, Carlos Infante and Armando Navarrete.

On 5 July 2007 Kleber returned to Brazil with Santos and signed a deal until June 30, 2008. Kléber finished as the Campeonato Brasileiro Série A 2008 top scorer, with 21 goals, tied with Washington and Keirrison.

Honours

Club 

Atlético-PR
 Brazilian Série A: 2001
 Paraná State League: 2000, 2001, 2002

Club América
 Mexican Championship: Clausura 2005
 Mexican Championship Campeón De Campeones (Mexican Super Cup): 2004–05
 CONCACAF Champions League: 2006

Individual 
 Mexican Primera División Top scorer (Shared): Apertura 2005
 Campeonato Brasileiro Série A Team of the Year: 2008
 Campeonato Brasileiro Série A top goalscorer: 2008

References

External links 

footballdatabase.com 

1975 births
Living people
Sportspeople from Maranhão
Brazilian footballers
Brazilian expatriate footballers
Campeonato Brasileiro Série A players
Liga MX players
Moto Club de São Luís players
Clube Náutico Capibaribe players
Club Athletico Paranaense players
Sport Club Internacional players
FC Sion players
Tigres UANL footballers
C.D. Veracruz footballers
Club América footballers
Club Necaxa footballers
Santos FC players
Expatriate footballers in Mexico
Expatriate footballers in Switzerland
Association football forwards